Peter Vives Newey (born 14 July 1987) is a Spanish actor. He was born in Barcelona to a New Zealand mother and a Spanish father. He is perhaps best known for his role as Angel in The Cheetah Girls 2, where he sang and played the guitar. He also starred in television series El tiempo entre costuras as Marcus Logan.

Filmography

References

External links

Living people
Spanish male film actors
Spanish male television actors
1987 births
21st-century Spanish male actors